The 1889 Ottawa Hockey Club season was the fourth season of play of the Ottawa Hockey Club. The Ottawa Hockey Club re-organized after the opening of the Rideau Skating Rink, after playing no competitive games in the 1888 winter season.

Team business
P. D. Ross, the new publisher of the Ottawa Journal became the team president.

Season
The captain was Frank Jenkins, and the other players were Halder Kirby, Jack Kerr, Nelson Porter, Ross, George Young, Weldy Young, Thomas D. Green, William O'Dell, Tom Gallagher, Albert Low and Henry Ami. In 1889, the club did not issue any challenges for the AHAC title. The club played only one match against an outside club, an exhibition at the Rideau Rink against the Montreal Hockey Club 'second' team.

Roster
 Edwin 'Ted' Dey
 Frank Jenkins
 Jack Kerr
 Halder Kirby
 Nelson Porter
 George Young
 Weldy Young

References

 

Ottawa Senators (original) seasons
Ottawa